Liazid Sandjak (born 11 September 1966) is a former Algerian international footballer. In his career, he was a midfielder for several French and Swiss clubs and member of the Algeria national team.

Career
Sandjak played professional football with Paris Saint-Germain F.C., OGC Nice, AS Saint-Étienne and Neuchâtel Xamax. Late in his career, he played amateur football with Olympique Noisy-le-Sec, where he received a two-year ban for shoving the referee after a match against Alès in October 2000.

Sandjak made a substitute's appearance for the Algeria national football team in a 1988 African Cup of Nations qualifier against Tunisia in April 1987. He also appeared in the 1992 African Cup of Nations finals in Senegal.

References

External links
 
 
 

Living people
1966 births
Sportspeople from Montreuil, Seine-Saint-Denis
Association football midfielders
French footballers
Algerian footballers
Algerian expatriate footballers
Algeria international footballers
1992 African Cup of Nations players
Paris Saint-Germain F.C. players
OGC Nice players
AS Saint-Étienne players
Neuchâtel Xamax FCS players
Ligue 1 players
Ligue 2 players
Kabyle people
French people of Kabyle descent
French sportspeople of Algerian descent
Expatriate footballers in Switzerland
Olympique Noisy-le-Sec players
Algerian expatriate sportspeople in Switzerland
Footballers from Seine-Saint-Denis